The lipstick effect is the theory that when facing an economic crisis consumers will be more willing to buy less costly luxury goods. Instead of buying expensive purses and fur coats, for example, people will buy expensive cosmetics, such as high-end brands of lipstick. The underlying assumption is that a certain portion of consumers will still buy luxury goods even during a bad economy. When consumer trust in the economy is dwindling, consumers will buy goods that have less impact on their available funds. Outside the cosmetics market, consumers might be tempted to purchase other high-end goods such as expensive beers, or smaller, less costly electronic gadgets.

It has been rumored that lipstick sales doubled after the 9/11 attacks on the United States; however, other sources say this is an overstatement. In a New York Times article published May 1, 2008, Leonard Lauder is quoted as saying that he noted his company's sales of lipstick rose after the terrorist attacks, he did not claim they doubled. Juliet Shor in her book The Over Spent American talks to consumer's purchase of higher-priced, more prestigious lipsticks, specifically Chanel, that are used in public, vs. lower-priced, less prestigious brands that are used in the privacy of the bathroom.

The Economist tested the lipstick effect in 2009 with statistical analysis, stating that "reliable historical figures on lipstick sales are hard to find, and most lipstick believers can only point to isolated, anecdotal examples as evidence of the larger phenomenon. Data collected by Kline & Company, a market-research group, show that lipstick sales sometimes increase during times of economic distress, but have also been known to grow during periods of prosperity. In other words, there is no clear correlation."

References

Economics effects
Cosmetics
Lipstick